Roderick Iain McAllister RIBA FRSA is a British architect and film-maker.

McAllister read architecture at Girton College, Cambridge and University of Liverpool Schools of Architecture. He was a founding partner of King McAllister with Dave King, Liverpool; principal of McAllister Co and McAlllister ADF, London; lecturer at Liverpool School of Architecture and visiting professor at University of Rome La Sapienza and was a partner of Sheppard Robson, London 2003-14.

Notable works

Masterplan of University of Perpignan, France; International Union of Architects Jeune Architects Grand Prix

Architects Dave King & Rod McAllister/King McAllister:

Liverpool School of Architecture, New Studios and Galleries; Royal Institute of British Architects Award
Student Services Centre, University of Liverpool; Royal Institute of British Architects Award

McAllister Co/ADF:

Mellangoose, Falmouth, Cornwall; Royal Institute of British Architects Award 
Battersea Park Boat House, London; Building of the Year Award, Royal Fine Art Commission Trust
Battersea Park Pump House, London; Civic Trust Commendation
Tawny House, Bath, completed 2017

Sheppard Robson:

The Small Animal Teaching Hospital at the University of Liverpool School of Veterinary Science, Royal Institute of British Architects Award 2008, Civic Trust Award 2008
The Active Learning Labs, University of Liverpool Department of Engineering, completed 2009
London Business School Sammy Ofer Centre, completed 2016
Nelson Mandela Children's Hospital, Johannesburg, 2009 with John Cooper Architecture (London), GAPP Architects & Urban Designers and Ruben Reddy Architects(Johannesburg), South African Institute of Architects Award of Merit 2018

McAllister has produced and presented short documentary films about universities and architecture.

References

Building magazine 1999
Building magazine 2001
Wandsworth Council
Friends of Battersea Park
BD 2009
World Architecture News 2009
e-architect 2009
The Times Higher Education supplement 2009
What Society Wants From Architects debate 2011

External links
Cambridge School of Architecture
LSA
La Sapienza
Perpignan
UIA
Small Animal Teaching Hospital
Active Learning Labs
London Business School
Nelson Mandela Children's Hospital
RSA
RIBA
Civic Trust

People from Helston
Architects from Cornwall
Living people
Alumni of Girton College, Cambridge
Alumni of the University of Liverpool
Year of birth missing (living people)